Malemort-Lafont is a former railway station in Malemort-sur-Corrèze, Limousin, France. The station was located on the Coutras–Tulle railway line, between Brive-la-Gaillarde and Tulle.

References

Defunct railway stations in Corrèze